The Exeter Hawks are a Junior ice hockey team based in Exeter, Ontario, Canada.  They play in the Provincial Junior Hockey League of the Ontario Hockey Association.

History

The Exeter Hawks were founded in 1961 as members of the Shamrock Junior D Hockey League.  In the late sixties, the Hawks jumped to the Bluewater Junior Hockey League for a short stint.  In 1969, the Shamrock league changed its name to the Western Junior D Hockey League.

In 1970–71, the Hawks won the Western League and made it all the way to the OHA provincial championship.  They met another junior team from Haliburton, Ontario from the South Central Junior D Hockey League.  Haliburton defeated the Hawks 4-games-to-3.

A season later, the Hawks again won the Western League and found themselves against an Eastern Ontario representative from Bancroft, Ontario in the provincial final.  This year the Hawks were not to be denied as they swept Bancroft 4-games-to-none to win the OHA Cup for the first time.

In 1977, the Hawks won their third Western League title and advanced to the provincial championship.  Their opponents were the Stayner Siskins, which they defeated 4-games-to-none to win their second provincial championship.

The next year, the Hawks again won the Western League and ran into the Lakefield Chiefs in the OHA Cup final.  The Chiefs overpowered the Hawks in the end, defeating Exeter in Game 7 of the series to claim the OHA Cup 4-games-to-3.

The playoffs for the 2019–20 season were cancelled due to the COVID-19 pandemic, leading to the team not being able to play a single game.

Season-by-season standings

Playoffs
1971 Won League, Lost OHA final
Haliburton Juniors defeated Exeter Hawks 4-games-to-3 in OHA final
1972 Won League, Won OHA championship
Exeter Hawks defeated Bancroft Juniors 4-games-to-none in OHA final
1977 Won League, Won OHA championship
Exeter Hawks defeated Stayner Siskins 4-games-to-none in OHA final
1978 Won League, Lost OHA final
Lakefield Chiefs defeated Exeter Hawks 4-games-to-3 in OHA final
1988 Lost OHA and League final
Lambeth Lancers defeated Exeter Hawks 4-games-to-2 in OHA final
1996 Won League
Exeter Hawks defeated Wellesley Applejacks 4-games-to-3 in final
1998 Lost final
Wellesley Applejacks defeated Exeter Hawks 4-games-to-3 in final
2002 Won League
Exeter Hawks defeated Tavistock Braves 4-games-to-none in final
2004 Won League
Exeter Hawks defeated Tavistock Braves 4-games-to-2 in final
2006 Lost conference quarter-final
Lucan Irish defeated Exeter Hawks 4-games-to-none in conf. quarter-final
2015 Won League
Exeter Hawks defeated Dorchester Dolphins 4-games-to-none in final

External links
Exeter Hawks' homepage

Southern Ontario Junior Hockey League teams
1961 establishments in Ontario
Ice hockey clubs established in 1961
Huron County, Ontario